New Habba Kadal is a concrete bridge located in the old city of Srinagar, in the Indian state of Jammu and Kashmir. It was built in 2001 to replace the original Habba Kadal bridge which is a wooden structure first built in 1551. The old bridge is one of the seven original bridges that have existed in the city for a long time and it still exists a few metres downstream of the new bridge.

In 2018, the New Habba Kadal bridge was fenced on either side to prevent people from throwing garbage and other waste into the Jhelum river.

See also
Abdullah Bridge
Amira Kadal
Budshah Bridge

References 

Bridges in Srinagar
Buildings and structures in Srinagar
Bridges over the Jhelum River
Bridges in Jammu and Kashmir
Bridges completed in the 20th century
Concrete bridges
Transport in Srinagar
20th-century architecture in India